Richard Merrill Mills Jr. (born February 23, 1959) is an American diplomat who serves as the United States deputy ambassador to the United Nations. He served as the U.S. Chargé d'Affaires and Acting Permanent Representative to the United Nations between January 20, 2021, and February 24, 2021, when Linda Thomas-Greenfield became ambassador. In July 2022, he was announced as the nominee to serve as the United States ambassador to Nigeria.

He previously served as the U.S. Chargé d'Affaires for Canada.

Early life and education
Mills was born in Louisiana, and grew up in Michigan. He received a Bachelor of Arts from Georgetown University, a Juris Doctor from the University of Texas School of Law, and a Master of Science in National Security Strategy from the National Defense University.

Career

Legal career
Prior to his Foreign Service career, Mills was an associate attorney in the Washington, D.C. office of Duncan, Allen and Mitchell, and then at the Washington, D.C. office of Wickwire, Gavin and Gibbs.

Diplomatic career
Mills's first tour as a Foreign Service Officer was at the U.S. embassy in Paris in 1988, where he served as a consular officer and staff assistant to Ambassador Walter Curley. He has had assignments in the Executive Secretariat at the Department of State (1996–1998), Dublin (1999–2001), the United States Mission to the United Nations in New York City (2001–2003), Islamabad (2003–2004), Riyadh (2005–2006), London (2006–2009), Baghdad (2009–2010), and Valletta (2010–2012). He then served as Deputy Chief of Mission at the U.S. embassy in Beirut, from 2012 to 2014. During his career, Mills has also served in the Office of Legislative Affairs, at the U.S. Consulate in Saint Petersburg, and in the now-defunct Bureau of Soviet Union Affairs. In July 2014, Mills was nominated by President Barack Obama to be the United States Ambassador to Armenia, a position in which he served until October 2018.

Mills holds the personal rank of Minister-Counselor in the United States Senior Foreign Service. He was a nominee for the Deputy Chief of Mission of the Year Award in 2012, and has received nine Superior Honor Awards from the Department of State. He speaks fluent French and conversational Russian.

Ambassador to Canada
In November 2018, Mills assumed the position of Deputy Chief of Mission at the Embassy of the United States in Ottawa. Following the resignation of United States Ambassador to Canada Kelly Craft in August 2019 upon her nomination to be US Ambassador to the UN, he became the acting Ambassador to Canada, with the title of Chargé d'affaires.

Deputy Ambassador to the UN
In January 2020, Mills was nominated to be the next United States Deputy Ambassador to the United Nations, again serving under now  United States Ambassador to the United Nations Linda Thomas-Greenfield. He was confirmed by the Senate on August 6, 2020. He arrived on November 8, 2020.

Ambassador to Nigeria
On July 11, 2022, President Joe Biden announced his intent to nominate Mills to be the next United States ambassador to Nigeria. On July 28, 2022, his nomination was sent to the Senate. His nomination was not acted upon for the rest of the year and was returned to Biden on January 3, 2023.

President Biden renominated Mills the same day. His nomination is pending before the Senate Foreign Relations Committee.

Previous roles in the Foreign Service

Consular Officer at the U.S. Embassy in Paris, France (1988–1990)
Desk Officer in the Bureau of Soviet Union Affairs, Washington D.C. (1990–1993)
Political Officer at the U.S. Consulate in St. Petersburg, Russia (1993–1995)
Legislative Affairs Officer at the Office of Legislative Affairs, Washington D.C. (1995–1996)
Line Director in the Executive Secretariat at the Department of State, Washington D.C. (1996–1998)
Economic Counselor at the U.S. Embassy in Dublin, Ireland (1999–2001)
Political Officer at the U.S. Mission to the United Nations, New York (2001–2003)
Deputy Political Counselor at the U.S. Embassy in Islamabad, Pakistan (2003–2004)
Energy Attaché and Acting Economic Counselor at the U.S. Embassy in Riyadh, Saudi Arabia (2005–2006)
Political Counselor at the U.S. Embassy in London, United Kingdom (2006–2009)
Senior Democracy Advisor at the U.S. Embassy in Baghdad, Iraq (2009–2010)
Deputy Chief of Mission and Chargé d'Affaires at the U.S. Embassy in Valletta, Malta (2010–2012)
Deputy Chief of Mission at the U.S. Embassy in Beirut, Lebanon (2012–2014)
Ambassador Extraordinary and Plenipotentiary to Armenia (2015–2018)
Deputy Chief of Mission and Chargé d'Affaires at the U.S. Embassy in Ottawa, Canada (2018–2020)
Deputy Representative, with rank and status of Ambassador Extraordinary and Plenipotentiary, and Chargé d'Affaires at the U.S. Mission to the United Nations in New York, and Deputy Representative to the U.N. Security Council (2020–2021)

Personal life
Mills is married to Leigh Gabrielle Carter, a retired U.S. Foreign Service Officer. They were married on October 18, 1991, in Arlington, Virginia.

See also
Ambassadors of the United States

References

External links

|-

|-

|-

1959 births
Living people
People from Louisiana
People from Michigan
Walsh School of Foreign Service alumni
University of Texas School of Law alumni
United States Foreign Service personnel
National Defense University alumni
21st-century American diplomats
Ambassadors of the United States to Armenia
Obama administration personnel
Trump administration personnel
Biden administration cabinet members